Ingvild Deila (born January 18, 1987) is a Norwegian actress. She is known for her roles in both low-budget independent films and large-scale blockbusters. She first appeared in film through her role as Mina in FISH (2013); this was followed by roles in 7 films all in 2014. This led to her role in the Marvel Cinematic Universe as a World Hub scientist in Oslo in Avengers: Age of Ultron (2015). Delia also played Princess Leia through motion capture in Rogue One (2016).

Career
Delia joined the Marvel Cinematic Universe in the 2015 film Avengers: Age of Ultron as the World Hub lead scientist.

Deila made a brief appearance as Princess Leia in the 2016 film Rogue One: A Star Wars Story. With the film set before 1977's Star Wars: Episode IV – A New Hope, a computer-generated image of a young Carrie Fisher was superimposed over Deila's face. Archival audio of Fisher saying "Hope" was used to voice the character.

Filmography

References

External links
 

1987 births
Living people
Norwegian film actresses
Norwegian emigrants to the United Kingdom